Kaplja Vas may refer to
Kaplja Vas, Komenda, a former village in northern Slovenia
Kaplja Vas, Prebold, a village in the Municipality of Prebold, eastern Slovenia
Kaplja Vas, Sevnica, a village in the Municipality of Sevnica, southeastern Slovenia